Waxed is the debut album of the Norwegian rock band BigBang. It was first released in 1995 then reissued in 2002 by Warner Music.

Overview
"Elle Vogue" is an instrumental bonus ghost track only included in the album's reedition from Greni's own Grandsport Records indie label to the Universal Norway major. As a matter of fact, "Down There Again" is clocked 14:30 in the year 2002 release. "Elle Vogue" is dedicated to fashion magazines (such as ELLE and Vogue) that expose women that ordinary men cannot afford, according to Øystein Greni's own statements.

Track listing
 "Bus Ride" – 4:04
 "Limo Driver" – 3:38
 "The Man" – 2:38
 "Little Cloud" – 3:48
 "Two O'Clock" – 4:06
 "Tennis Club" – 4:06
 "Marvin Dale" – 2:36
 "Rules Understood" – 2:44
 "Situations" – 4:30
 "Usually" – 3:17
 "Down There Again" – 2:50
 "Elle Vogue" (bonus track) – 2:00

Personnel
Øystein Greni - Lead vocals, guitars
Erik Tresselt - Bass, vocals
Christer Engen - drums, vocals
Iver Olav Erstad - Organ (on Tennis Club)

References

1995 debut albums
Bigbang (Norwegian band) albums